Robyn Nicholls (born 8 May 1990, Bolton) is a British water polo player. She competed for Great Britain in the women's tournament at the 2012 Summer Olympics. This was the first ever Olympic GB women's water polo team.

Career
Nicholls represented Britain at the European Nations Trophy in 2009, earning a gold medal. In 2010, she played professionally in Hungary, and later played club polo with City of Manchester. She was selected as a member of the 2012 Olympic squad.

Personal life
Nicholls was educated at Fred Longworth High School before studying economics at Manchester Metropolitan University. She developed an interest in water polo after watching her brother play as a child. She took up playing the game for herself aged 12 and also participated in swimming, running, triathlon, hockey and badminton

See also
 List of women's Olympic water polo tournament goalkeepers

References

1990 births
Living people
Sportspeople from Bolton
British female water polo players
Water polo goalkeepers
Olympic water polo players of Great Britain
Water polo players at the 2012 Summer Olympics